Lowell is the primary village and a census-designated place (CDP) in the town of Lowell, Orleans County, Vermont, United States. As of the 2020 census, it had a population of 254, out of 887 in the entire town of Lowell.

The CDP is in western Orleans County, at the geographic center of the town. It is in the valley of the East Branch of the Missisquoi River, which joins the Burgess Branch at the north end of the village to become the main stem of the Missisquoi, which flows north and then west to Lake Champlain.

Vermont Route 100 passes through the village center, leading north  to Troy village and southwest  to Hyde Park. Vermont Route 58 crosses Route 100 at the village center, leading east  to Irasburg and northwest over Hazens Notch  to Montgomery Center.

References 

Populated places in Orleans County, Vermont
Census-designated places in Orleans County, Vermont
Census-designated places in Vermont